The Floridsdorfer Athletics Sports Club or simply Floridsdorfer AC is a professional football club based in Floridsdorf, the 21st district of Vienna. The club was founded in August 1904. Floridsdorfer AC won the Austrian football championship in 1918 and are currently playing in the Austrian Football Second League. The club colours are blue and white.

Current squad

Out on loan

Honours
 Austrian Championship (1): 1917–18

List of managers

From 1930 onwards

  Richard Ziegler / Karl Schrott (1930–1931)
  Karl Jiszda (1931–1934)
  Ferdinand Humenberger (1935)
  Rudolf Seidl (1935–1940)
  Eduard Frühwirth (1939–1947)
  Anton Artes (1947–1948)
  Karl Durspekt (1948)
  Anton Artes (1949–19??)
 Unknown (1949–1982)
  Rudolf Sabetzer (1982–1983)
  Leopold Grausam (1984–1985)
 Unknown (1985–1992)
  Gustav Thaler (1992–1995)
  Walter Dannhauser (1995)
  Friedrich Täubler (1995)
  Helmut Senekowitsch (1995–1996)
  Gustav Thaler (1996–1997)
  Christian Keglevits (1997–2000)
  Erich Obermayer (2000–2001)
  Andreas Reisinger (2001)
  Rudolf Eggenberger (2001–2004)
  Peter Flicker (2004)
  Karl Berger (2004)
  Peter Flicker (2004–2005)
  Werner Gössinger (2006–2007)
  Damir Canadi (2007–2008)
  Dominik Thalhammer (2008)
  Peter Seher (2008)
  Andreas Ogris (2008–2010)
  Damir Canadi (2010)
  Christian Prosenik (2011)
  Hans Kleer (2011–2015)
  Peter Pacult (2015)
  Thomas Flögel (2015)
  Felix Gasselich (2015–2016)
  Jürgen Halper (2016)
  Franz Maresch (2017)
  Dominik Glawogger (2017)
  Thomas Eidler (2017–2018)
  Mario Handl (2018)
  Oliver Oberhammer (2018)
  Andreas Heraf (2018–2019)
  Mario Handl (2019–2020)
  Lukas Fischer /  Aleksandar Gitsov (2020)
  Miron Muslic (2020)
 Zealand (2021)
  Roman Ellensohn (2021)
  Mitja Mörec /  Aleksandar Gitsov (2021)
  Mitja Mörec (2021–present)

References

External links
 

Association football clubs established in 1904
Football clubs in Austria
Football clubs in Vienna
1904 establishments in Austria